The Purple Vigilantes is a 1938 American Western film directed by George Sherman and starring Robert Livingston, Ray Corrigan, and Max Terhune. Written by Betty Burbridge and Oliver Drake, the film is about a rancher who organizes other ranchers to form a vigilante group in order to rid their town of outlaws. After the outlaws are defeated, some of the men, posing as the vigilant group, go on a crime spree. The Purple Vigilantes is the 12th entry in the Three Mesquiteers series of B-movies produced by Republic Pictures. The film was released in the United Kingdom as Purple Riders because at that time the word "vigilante" was unknown in Britain.

John Denvir, in his book, Legal Reelism: Movies as Legal Texts, compared the hooded-and-robed vigilantes in the film to the Ku Klux Klan. He cited The Purple Vigilantes as being "the series western most clearly inspired by the Klan", noting that the film was "treating its hooded terrorist organization as originally serving a legitimate purpose but corrupted over time."

Cast
 Robert Livingston as Stony Brooke
 Ray Corrigan as Tucson Smith
 Max Terhune as Lullaby Joslin
 Joan Barclay as Jean McAllister
 Earl Dwire as David Ross
 Earle Hodgins as J. T. McAllister
 Francis Sayles as Wiliam Jones
 George Chesebro as Eggers
 Robert Fiske as George Drake
 Jack Perrin as Duncan
 Ernie Adams as Blake
 William Gould as Jenkins, Saloon Owner
 Harry Strang as Murphy
 Ed Cassidy as Sheriff Jim (as Edward Cassidy)

References

External links
 
 The Purple Vigilantes on YouTube

1938 films
1938 Western (genre) films
American Western (genre) films
1930s English-language films
American black-and-white films
Films directed by George Sherman
Republic Pictures films
Three Mesquiteers films
Films produced by Sol C. Siegel
1930s American films